Teen Mom 3 is an American reality television series that premiered on August 26, 2013, on MTV and concluded its run on November 18, 2013. It chronicles the lives of four girls from the fourth season of 16 and Pregnant as they navigate their first year of motherhood and changing social relationships. The series was announced on February 27, 2012, as the third installment of the Teen Mom franchise, coming one day before Teen Mom 2 concluded its second season. In December 2013, it was revealed by the cast, via Twitter, that Teen Mom 3 had been canceled after one season. In March 2017, it was announced that cast member Briana DeJesus would join the Teen Mom 2 cast for the eighth season. In July 2019, it was announced that cast member Mackenzie McKee would join the Teen Mom OG cast during the first half of the eighth season as a guest mom, before becoming a permanent cast member for the second half of the eighth season.

Cast

Briana DeJesus
Briana DeJesus (from Orlando, Florida) got pregnant by her ex-boyfriend, Devoin Austin II. Her daughter Nova Star DeJesus was born on September 10, 2011.

Mackenzie McKee

Mackenzie McKee (née Douthit) (from Miami, Oklahoma) welcomed her first son, Gannon Dewayne McKee, on September 12, 2011, with her husband, Josh McKee. It was announced on August 13, 2013, that the couple were expecting a second child. Josh and Mackenzie married on August 17, 2013. On February 7, 2014, Mackenzie gave birth to her second child, a girl, Jaxie Taylor McKee. McKee gave birth to son Broncs Weston on August 14, 2016.

Alex Sekella
Alexandria Sekella (from Allentown, Pennsylvania) is an aspiring dancer who had a baby with her ex-boyfriend, Matt McCann. Alex's mother made it clear that if Sekella did not place the baby up for adoption, Sekella and the baby would have no place to live. Sekella's and McCann's daughter, Arabella Elizabeth Sekella-McCann, was born on July 18, 2011. McCann and Sekella have since broken off their engagement, and McCann spent time in rehab for his drug addiction.

Katie Yeager
Katie Yeager (from Rock Springs, Wyoming) and Joey Maes became the parents of daughter Molli J. Maes on August 18, 2011.

Episodes

References

2010s American reality television series
2013 American television series debuts
2013 American television series endings
American television spin-offs
English-language television shows
Teenage pregnancy in television
MTV reality television series
Reality television spin-offs
Television series about teenagers